The 1980–81 season was the 79th in the history of the Western Football League.

The league champions for the second time in their history were Bridgwater Town. The champions of Division One were Chippenham Town.

Premier Division
The Premier Division remained at twenty clubs after Ilminster Town were relegated to the First Division, and A.F.C. Bournemouth Reserves and Exeter City Reserves left the league. Three clubs joined:

Devizes Town, runners-up in the First Division.
Liskeard Athletic, third-placed club in the First Division.
Melksham Town, champions of the First Division.
Dawlish changed their name to Dawlish Town.

League table

First Division
The First Division was reduced from twenty-two to nineteen clubs after Westland-Yeovil left the league, and Devizes Town, Liskeard Athletic and Melksham Town were promoted to the Premier Division. One new club joined:

Ilminster Town, relegated from the Premier Division.

League table

References

Western Football League seasons
6